Strophingia is a genus of true bugs belonging to the family Liviidae.

The species of this genus are found in Europe.

Species:
 Strophingia arborea Loginova, 1976 
 Strophingia australis Hodkinson, 1981

References

Psylloidea
Hemiptera genera